Nikita V. Mackey is an American former lawyer and politician. He served as a Democratic member  of the North Carolina House of Representatives, representing the 99th district.

Mackey worked for 14 years as a police officer with the Charlotte-Mecklenburg Police Department before resigning in 2003 due to allegations that he had produced fraudulent time sheets. A few years later, Mackey was elected sheriff in Mecklenburg County, North Carolina, but the election results were nullified due to questionable voting practices. Daniel "Chipp" Bailey ultimately became sheriff.

In 2009, Mackey was elected to represent the 99th district of the North Carolina House of Representatives, succeeding Drew Saunders. In 2010, the North Carolina State Bar revoked Mackey's law license for up to three years because he did not disclose on his 2002 license application his failure to pay income taxes, and further failed to disclose his alleged misconduct when employed by the Charlotte-Mecklenburg Police Department. The day after his law license was suspended, Mackey lost his bid for re-election; he was defeated in the primary election by Rodney Moore, who later won the 99th district seat. Mackey's law license was reinstated in June 2011.

In 2016, one of Mackey's law clients was released from prison after serving 10 years of a 30-year sentence for conspiracy and racketeering. The court found that Mackey had been sleeping during the man's trial. Mackey was disbarred in February 2022 after pleading guilty in 2020 to multiple charges stemming from two incidents in which he fired gunshots into buildings owned by his wife or her relatives.

Electoral history

2010

2008

References

Living people
Place of birth missing (living people)
Year of birth missing (living people)
Democratic Party members of the North Carolina House of Representatives
21st-century American politicians
21st-century African-American politicians
20th-century African-American people
21st-century African-American people
North Carolina lawyers
American law enforcement officials
African Americans in law enforcement